Donald Priestly Stephenson (July 10, 1935 – November 25, 1985) is a former Canadian football player who played for the Edmonton Eskimos and Calgary Stampeders. He played college football at Georgia Tech.

References

1935 births
1985 deaths
American football centers
Calgary Stampeders players
Canadian football offensive linemen
Edmonton Elks players
Georgia Tech Yellow Jackets football players
Place of birth missing